The 1964 United States Road Racing Championship season was the second season of the Sports Car Club of America's United States Road Racing Championship. It began March 1, 1964, and ended September 13, 1964, after ten races.  A second GT class for cars under two liters of displacement was added.  Separate races for sportscars and GTs were held at eight rounds, while two rounds were combined races. Jim Hall won the season championship.

Schedule

Season results
Overall winner in bold.

External links
World Sports Racing Prototypes: USRRC 1964
World Sports Racing Prototypes: USRRC GT 1964
Racing Sports Cars: USRRC archive

United States Road Racing Championship
United States Road Racing Championship